Linnaea amabilis, also known under the synonym Kolkwitzia amabilis  and the English name beauty bush, is a species of flowering plant in the family Caprifoliaceae. It is a deciduous shrub grown as an ornamental plant. In China, where it originated, the plant is called wèi shí  (蝟实).

Description

It is usually as wide as it is tall. The plant blooms in late spring. Its light pink flowers, dark pink in the bud, are about one-inch long and bell-shaped ("tubular campanulate"); they grow in pairs, as with all Caprifoliaceae, and form showy, numerous sprays along ripened wood. Its fruit is a hairy, ovoid capsule approximately  inches long.

Taxonomy
The species was first described by Paul Graebner and placed in his new genus, Kolkwitzia, whose name honours Richard Kolkwitz, a professor of botany in Berlin. The specific epithet amabilis means "lovely". In 2013, it was suggested that Kolkwitzia, along with the genera Abelia, Diabelia, Dipelta and Vesalea, be merged into an expanded genus Linnaea.

History
The beauty bush originates in Central China, where it has been discovered for western science twice; once by the Jesuit missionary Giuseppe Giraldi in Shensi, and then in western Hubei province by the British explorer and plant collector E.H. Wilson. Wilson sent plant material to his sponsors Veitch Nurseries in Exeter in 1901, where the shrub flowered for the first time in 1910. The shrub became very popular in the eastern United States following World War I – almost a defining shrub in American gardens made between the World Wars. It is very rare and threatened in the wild.

Cultivation
Numerous cultivars have been developed for garden use. Under the synonym Kolkwitzia amabilis the cultivar ‘Pink Cloud’ has gained the Royal Horticultural Society’s Award of Garden Merit.

Pruning
Opinions differ concerning how much pruning the shrub needs. Others suggest more active intervention to encourage development of new flowering branches and buds, with decisive pruning immediately after flowering.

References

External links

 

Caprifoliaceae
Flora of China